Bloodcow is an American metal band from Council Bluffs, Iowa.

Members
The Corporate Merger (vocals)
1987 (guitar)
Bones (guitar)
Navin (bass)
Dave Collins (drums)

Previous members
Dead Knight (drums)
Medium Rare (drums)
Bobbie Bibledick (bass)
Clamb (bass)

Discography
Killbodies (2003)
Railroad City (2005)
Bloodcow III : Hail Xenu  (2007)
Crystals and Lasers  (2014)

References

Musical groups established in 2000